Johann Georg Rosenmüller (18 December 1736 – 14 March 1815), a German Protestant theologian, was born at Ummerstadt in Hildburghausen, on 18 December 1736. He was appointed Professor of Theology at Erlangen in 1773, Primarius Professor of Theology at Erlangen in 1773, Primarius Professor of Divinity at Giessen in 1783, and was called in 1785 to Leipzig, where he remained until his death in 1815. His two sons were Ernst Friedrich Karl Rosenmüller, and Johann Christian Rosenmüller.

Writings

His chief writings are:
 Morgen-und Abendandachten
 Betrachtungen über die vornehmsten Warheiten der Religion auf alle Tage des Jahres
 Auserlesnes Beicht-und Communionbuch
 Predigten über auserlesene Stellen der Heiligen Schrift
 Beiträge zur Homiletik
 Scholia in Novum Testamentum
 Historia Interpretationis Librorum Sacrorum in Ecclesia Christiana

1736 births
1815 deaths
18th-century German Protestant theologians
German male non-fiction writers